Sorken is a village in Engerdal municipality in Innlandet county, Norway.

Its population in 1999 was 235, but since 2001 it is not considered an urban settlement by Statistics Norway, and its data is therefore not tracked anymore.

References

Engerdal
Villages in Innlandet